Schönherr, Schoenherr may refer to:

Schönherr 
 Albrecht Schönherr (1911–2009), Protestant theologian and parish priest
 Annemarie Schönherr (born 1932), German theologian
 Carl Johan Schönherr, ( zoological author abbreviation - Schoenherr) (1772–1848) Swedish naturalist and entomologist
 Christoph Schönherr (born 1952), German composer and lecturer
 Daniel Schönherr (? - 1609), Saxon jurist and Mayor of Leipzig (1597–1600)
 David Schönherr (1822–1897), historian and publicist
 Dietmar Schönherr (1926–2014), Austrian actor, presenter and writer
 Eva Schönherr (born 1953), actress, film maker, author, and Ururenkelin von Louis Ferdinand Schönherr
 Hugo Schönherr, German architect
 Ivonne Schönherr (born 1981), actress
 Karl Schönherr (1867–1943), Austrian doctor, and writer of Austrian Heimat themes
 Louis (Ferdinand) Schönherr (1817–1911), inventor and businessman
 Max Schönherr (1903–1984), Austrian composer, conductor, and writer on music
 Oscar Emil Schönherr (1903–1968), teacher, musician and composer

Schoenherr 
 John Schoenherr (1935–2010), American illustrator
 Karl E. Schoenherr
 Walter Joseph Schoenherr (1920–2007), American Catholic bishop

See also 
 Schoenherr Attorneys at Law
 Hasora schoenherr
 Schoenherr Road

German-language surnames